is a private university in Shinjuku, Tokyo, Japan. The predecessor of the school, a women's vocational school, was founded 1923. In 1952 it was chartered as a junior women's college. In 1964 it became a four-year college and it was named . In 2011 it changed its name "Bunka Gakuen University".

History 

Bunka Gakuen University is a part of a large conglomerate of institutions including the Bunka Fashion College within the same campus in Shinjuku, Tokyo. Bunka Fashion College is regularly ranked within the top 10 in the world. In 2012 Bunka Gakuen University and Bunka Fashion College opened a Masters level course in Fashion Studies aimed at foreign students. This course is called the Global Fashion Concentration and is taught completely in English.

Main campus

The university's main campus is in the western part of Tokyo's Shinjuku neighborhood. The main building is 21 stories tall, and includes facilities such as a library, costume museum, and a resource center. The main campus is about an 8-minute walk from JR Shinjuku Station and about a 3-minute walk from the #6 exit of the Toei Shinjuku subway station.

The campus is shared with 4 colleges and universities from Bunka Gakuen. The other 3 institutions are Bunka Fashion College, Bunka Fashion Graduate University, and Bunka Institute of Language.

Affiliated Primary and Secondary Schools

 Bunka Gakuen University Suginami Junior and Senior High School  (renamed in 2011)
 Bunka Suginami Canadian International School (BSCIS)
 Bunka Gakuen Nagano Junior and Senior High School (The name of the school was changed from Bunka Women's University Nagano High School to Bunka Gakuen Nagano High School in 2011, and the junior high school opened on April 1, 2014)
 Bunka Gakuen Nagano Senmon Gakko
 Bunka Gakuen University Violet Kindergarten
 Bunka Gakuen University Kindergarten

References

External links
 Official website 
 Official website 
 Bunka Suginami Canadian International School official website 

 
Educational institutions established in 1923
Private universities and colleges in Japan
1923 establishments in Japan
Former women's universities and colleges in Japan